KIDA, VHF analog channel 5, was an independent television station licensed to Sun Valley, Idaho, United States. Founded October 25, 2000, the station was owned by Turner Enterprises.

History

It carried programming from UPN at its sign-on; however, it had lost the affiliation to KTWT-LP by December 2004. Later, programming consisted primarily of infomercials.  Neither Cox Communications in Sun Valley or Cable One in Twin Falls included KIDA in their line-ups.

Because it was granted an original construction permit after the FCC finalized the DTV allotment plan on April 21, 1997, the station did not receive a companion channel for a digital television station. Instead, on or before June 12, 2009, which was the end of the digital TV conversion period for full-service stations, KIDA was to have turned off its analog signal and turn on its digital signal (called a "flash cut").

The station had a pre-digital transition allotment for digital channel 32, but never utilized it. Marcia Turner, doing business as Turner Enterprises, filed for special temporary authority to remain silent on June 18, 2009 citing financial reasons and its inability to construct the digital facilities required by June 12, 2009. However, KIDA did not even apply for a construction permit for such facilities, and as a result the FCC dismissed the STA and revoked its license on October 6, 2009.

References

Defunct television stations in the United States
Television channels and stations established in 2003
Television channels and stations disestablished in 2009
2003 establishments in Idaho
2009 disestablishments in Idaho
IDA